Doreen Kong Yuk-foon (born 1970) is a Hong Kong solicitor and  She was elected as a member of Legislative Council for the Election Committee constituency heavily skewed the pro-Beijing camp.

Early years 
Kong, an orphan, was adopted after birth. She managed to study law in the University of Hong Kong despite of the poor family background. After graduated with LL.B. in 1992 and PCLL in 1994, she was  focusing on housing issues.

Political career 
During the Umbrella Movement in 2014, Kong organised a silent assembly. Calling the protestors "trampling" rule-of-law", she urged them to obey injunctions by the court and end the occupation. Kong joined the pro-Beijing New People's Party in the same year. She ran in the 2015 local elections, as the party's candidate in Kornhill Garden constituency, but was defeated by the Civic. A year later, she quitted the party and joined the team of Jasper Tsang, former President of the Legislative Council, as an advisor. She was elected as an executive of Law Society and appointed as a committee member of Independent Commission Against Corruption in 2019 and 2020 respectively.

In 2021, Kong was elected as a member of the Legislative Council after winning in the Election Committee constituency controlled by pro-Beijing camp. During the campaign, she called on the Government to speed-up the legislation of Article 23, a provision in Basic Law related to national security.

In July 2022, Kong was critical of foreign domestic helpers, who were operating food stalls on public pavement.

In October 2022, Kong criticized the government and Lo Chung-mau for invalidating 20,000 COVID-19 vaccine exemption passes, stating that he had no legal authority to do so, with Kong asking "Who is destroying the rule of law now?"

In February 2023, Kong criticized the government for planning to impose extra betting taxes on the Hong Kong Jockey Club, saying it was unfair.

In March 2023, she championed the cause of Chan Tan-ching a 90 year old licensed street hawker whose cart was seized by the Food and Hygiene Department

In March 2023, Kong was the only lawmaker to vote against a measure to build temporary public housing.

Electoral performances

References 

Living people
1970 births
Hong Kong politicians